Thomas Frank "Tully" Sparks (December 12, 1874 – July 15, 1937), was a former professional baseball player who played pitcher in the Major Leagues from 1897 to 1910. Sparks played for the Philadelphia Phillies, Pittsburgh Pirates, Milwaukee Brewers, New York Giants, and Boston Americans.  He was an alumnus of Beloit College.

In 1899, while with the Pirates, Sparks led the National League in relief innings pitched and ERA.

See also
 Top 100 Major League Baseball hit batsmen leaders

References

External links

1874 births
1937 deaths
Major League Baseball pitchers
Baseball players from Georgia (U.S. state)
Boston Americans players
Philadelphia Phillies players
Pittsburgh Pirates players
New York Giants (NL) players
Milwaukee Brewers (1901) players
Beloit Buccaneers baseball players
Montgomery Grays players
Birmingham Bluebirds players
Mobile Blackbirds players
Galveston Sandcrabs players
Fort Worth Panthers players
Richmond Bluebirds players
Milwaukee Brewers (minor league) players
19th-century baseball players